Van Roy is a surname. Notable people with the surname include:

Frans Van Roy, Belgian academic and biologist
Karl Van Roy (1938-2022), American politician
Paul Van Roy (1931/32–2020), Belgian basketball player and journalist
Sand Van Roy, Dutch actress

Surnames of Dutch origin